"But I Do Love You" is a song recorded by American country music artist LeAnn Rimes. It was released in the US as a single from the Coyote Ugly soundtrack on February 9, 2001 and in the UK on February 11, 2002. The song was written by Diane Warren.

The song was featured on Rimes' 2002 compilation album, I Need You with the Almighty Radio Edit featured as a bonus track, the Almighty Radio Edit was later included on the More Music from Coyote Ugly in 2003. In 2004, the song was featured on The Best of LeAnn Rimes with the Almighty Radio Edit featured on the remix edition.

It peaked at number 18 on the US Billboard Country Songs chart. Internationally it peaked at 20 on UK Singles Chart and 48 on the Irish Singles Chart.

Background
The song is from the 2000 film Coyote Ugly and was originally intended to be sung by American stage, film and television actress, Piper Perabo, but after her audition to sing "Can't Fight the Moonlight" and watching the film, American country pop artist LeAnn Rimes decided to record all the songs for the film and provide the singing voice for Perabo. The theatrical trailer for the film included Perabo's original recording of the song prior to Rimes recording it.

Release
"But I Do Love You" was first released on the soundtrack for Coyote Ugly on August 1, 2000. It was later released as a B-side track to the single "Can't Fight the Moonlight" on August 22, 2000. The song was released to country radio in the U.S. on February 9, 2001.  It was released in the UK on February 11, 2002 In March of 2002 it was included on Rimes' compilation album, I Need You, with the Almighty Radio Edit included as a bonus track. In 2003, the Almighty Radio Edit of the song would be included on the More Music from Coyote Ugly  soundtrack on January 28, 2003. In 2004, the song was included on The Best of LeAnn Rimes, while the Almighty Radio Edit was released on the remixed edition.

Composition

"But I Do Love You" is a song of three minutes and twenty seconds. It was written by Diane Warren and recorded by LeAnn Rimes. The song is written in the key of C major with Rimes' vocals spanning two octaves, from B3 to B4 The song is produced by Trevor Horn with executive production by Jerry Bruckheimer, Kathy Nelson and Mike Curb. Orchestral arrangements were done by David Campbell with engineering and mixing done by Steve MacMillan. Additional engineering was done by Tim Weidner, Greg Hunt, Gary Leach and Austin Deptula.

Critical reception
The song received a favorable review from Deborah Evans Price of Billboard, who wrote that "Rimes is an ever-evolving stylist of the first degree, and she nails this catchy midtempo track from start to finish." Another review in Billboard, from 2000, stated that the song is "beautifully written" and that it is "AC-hitworthy." Heather Phares of Allmusic considered the song a "Jewel-esque love song".

Chart performance
The song debuted at number sixty on the US Billboard Hot Country Singles & Tracks chart for the week of February 24, 2001 and peaked at number eighteen.

Internationally the song peaked at number twenty on the UK Singles Chart and number forty-eight on the Irish Singles Chart.

Track listing
UK CD single
But I Do Love You — 3:20
But I Do Love You (Ian Van Dahl Radio Edit) — 3:35
Can't Fight the Moonlight (Latino Mix) — 3:35

Digital Download
But I Do Love You (Almighty Radio Edit) — 4:05
But I Do Love You (Almighty Extended Mix) — 7:14
But I Do Love You (Ian Van Dahl Radio Edit) — 3:35
But I Do Love You (Ian Van Dahl Extended Mix) — 8:10

US "Can't Fight the Moonlight" CD/Cassette tape single
 "Can't Fight the Moonlight" — 3:35
 "But I Do Love You" — 3:20

Dave Aude 20th Anniversary Mix - Single
 "But I Do Love You" (Dave Aude Mix) - 3:16
 "But I Do Love You" (Dave Aude Extended Mix) - 4:12
 "But I Do Love You" - 3:21

Charts

References

External links
"But I Do Love You" official music video at official site.

2001 singles
LeAnn Rimes songs
Curb Records singles
Songs written by Diane Warren
2000 songs